(born July 18, 1983) is a Japanese professional mixed martial artist competing in the featherweight division. He is the former Shooto Lightweight Champion, Sengoku Featherweight Champion, and TKO Featherweight Champion.  Hioki is a long time Shooto veteran and has fought most of his fights in Japanese promotions including the largest mixed martial arts organization at the time, Pride Fighting Championships.

Mixed martial arts career

TKO Major League MMA
Hioki won his first MMA title in the Canadian promotion TKO Major League MMA, by defeating Mark Hominick for the featherweight belt. Prior to this Hioki had only one loss to Hiroyuki Takaya in Shooto and had a record of 8-1-1. He successfully defended this title twice before participating in the Sengoku Featherweight Grand Prix tournament.

Sengoku Featherweight Grand Prix
Hioki defeated Masanori Kanehara in the semi-final of the tournament but was unable to continue on to the final to fight Michihiro Omigawa due to an injury in his bout with Kanehara. Kanehara replaced Hioki for the final and ended up winning the tournament.

Shooto Featherweight Championship
On May 30, 2010 Hioki fought Takeshi Inoue for the Shooto Featherweight Championship (143 lbs) and won by a split decision making him the 9th fighter to win it and the 8th Japanese fighter to do so. Hioki had a controversially lost to Antonio Carvalho during his Shooto career.

Sengoku Featherweight Championship
After defeating Jeff Lawson at Sengoku Raiden Championships 14, Hioki received a title shot against then WVR: Sengoku Featherweight Champion Marlon Sandro. The Championship fight was held at World Victory Road Presents: Soul of Fight on December 30, 2010. Hioki defeated Sandro via unanimous decision. Hioki's superior reach and movement allowed him to out land and counter the aggressive Brazilian. Hioki became the third featherweight Champion for Sengoku.

Hioki vacated the title on June 25, 2011 after signing with the UFC.

Ultimate Fighting Championship
On the same date he vacated the Sengoku Featherweight Championship: June 25, 2011, UFC officials announced that Hioki had signed a multi fight deal with the UFC.  He debuted at UFC 137 on October 29, 2011, where he defeated George Roop via split decision.

Hioki faced veteran Bart Palaszewski on February 26, 2012 at UFC 144, winning the bout via unanimous decision.  Hioki dominated the whole fight taking down Bart Palaszewski several times and applying a variety of submission attempts.

Hioki was offered a title shot but turned it down and instead faced Ricardo Lamas on June 22, 2012 at UFC on FX: Maynard vs. Guida. He lost the fight via unanimous decision.

Hioki faced Clay Guida on January 26, 2013 at UFC on Fox: Johnson vs. Dodson. Despite landing more strikes than Guida, and consistently looking for submissions after being taken to the ground, Guida was awarded the split decision.

Hioki faced Darren Elkins on August 28, 2013 at UFC Fight Night 27. He lost the fight via unanimous decision.

Hioki faced Ivan Menjivar on March 1, 2014 at UFC Fight Night: Kim vs. Hathaway. He won the fight via unanimous decision.

Hioki faced Charles Oliveira on June 28, 2014 at UFC Fight Night 43. He lost the fight via submission, with the loss being the first time Hioki has ever been finished in MMA.

Hioki faced Dan Hooker on May 10, 2015 at UFC Fight Night 65. He lost the fight by knockout in the second round, marking his first loss by TKO/KO.  Subsequently, he was released from the promotion.

Championships and accomplishments

Mixed martial arts
Sengoku Raiden Championships
Sengoku Featherweight Championship (One time)
2009 Sengoku Featherweight GP Semifinalist
Professional Shooto Japan
Shooto Featherweight Championship (One time)
TKO Major League MMA
TKO Featherweight Championship (One time; last)
Two successful title defenses

Mixed martial arts record

|-
| Loss
| align=center|
| Mikuru Asakura
| KO (Head Kick and Punches)
|Rizin 12
||
|align=center|1
|align=center|3:45
|Nagoya, Japan
|
|-
| Loss
| align=center|29–11–2
| Hiroyuki Takaya
| KO (punches)
| Pancrase 290
| 
| align=center|1
| align=center|1:12
| Tokyo, Japan
| 
|-
|Loss
|align=center|29–10–2
|Hiroshige Tanaka
|KO (punch)
| Pancrase 287
| 
|align=center|1
|align=center|0:14
|Tokyo, Japan
|
|-
|Win
|align=center|29–9–2
|Yojiro Uchimura
|Decision (unanimous)
| Pancrase 278
| 
|align=center|3
|align=center|5:00
|Tokyo, Japan
|
|-
|Win
|align=center|28–9–2
|Kyosuke Yokoyama
|Submission (rear naked choke)
| Pancrase 275
| 
|align=center|1
|align=center|1:35
|Tokyo, Japan
|
|-
|Loss
|align=center|27–9–2
|Dan Hooker
|KO (head kick and punches)
|UFC Fight Night: Miocic vs. Hunt
| 
|align=center|2
|align=center|4:13
|Adelaide, Australia
|
|-
| Loss
| align=center| 27–8–2
| Charles Oliveira
| Submission (anaconda choke)
| UFC Fight Night: Te Huna vs. Marquardt
| 
| align=center| 2
| align=center| 4:28
| Auckland, New Zealand
|
|-
| Win
| align=center| 27–7–2
| Ivan Menjivar
| Decision (unanimous)
| The Ultimate Fighter China Finale: Kim vs. Hathaway
| 
| align=center| 3
| align=center| 5:00
| Macau, SAR, China
|
|-
| Loss
| align=center| 26–7–2
| Darren Elkins
| Decision (unanimous)
| UFC Fight Night: Condit vs. Kampmann 2
| 
| align=center| 3
| align=center| 5:00
| Indianapolis, Indiana, United States
| 
|-
| Loss
| align=center| 26–6–2
| Clay Guida
| Decision (split)
| UFC on Fox: Johnson vs. Dodson
| 
| align=center| 3
| align=center| 5:00
| Chicago, Illinois, United States
| 
|-
| Loss
| align=center| 26–5–2
| Ricardo Lamas
| Decision (unanimous)
| UFC on FX: Maynard vs. Guida
| 
| align=center| 3
| align=center| 5:00
| Atlantic City, New Jersey, United States
| 
|-
| Win
| align=center| 26–4–2
| Bart Palaszewski
| Decision (unanimous)
| UFC 144
| 
| align=center| 3
| align=center| 5:00
| Saitama, Japan
| 
|-
| Win
| align=center| 25–4–2
| George Roop
| Decision (split)
| UFC 137
| 
| align=center| 3
| align=center| 5:00
| Las Vegas, Nevada, United States
| 
|-
| Win
| align=center| 24–4–2
| Donald Sanchez
| Submission (triangle choke)
| Shooto: Shooto Tradition 2011
| 
| align=center| 2
| align=center| 1:36
| Tokyo, Japan
| 
|-
| Win
| align=center| 23–4–2
| Marlon Sandro
| Decision (unanimous)
| World Victory Road Presents: Soul of Fight
| 
| align=center| 5
| align=center| 5:00
| Tokyo, Japan
| 
|-
| Win
| align=center| 22–4–2
| Jeff Lawson
| Submission (triangle choke)
| World Victory Road Presents: Sengoku Raiden Championships 14
| 
| align=center| 1
| align=center| 2:09
| Tokyo, Japan
| 
|-
| Win
| align=center| 21–4–2
| Takeshi Inoue
| Decision (split)
| Shooto: The Way of Shooto 3: Like a Tiger, Like a Dragon
| 
| align=center| 3
| align=center| 5:00
| Tokyo, Japan
| 
|-
| Loss
| align=center| 20–4–2
| Michihiro Omigawa
| Decision (split)
| World Victory Road Presents: Sengoku 11
| 
| align=center| 3
| align=center| 5:00
| Tokyo, Japan
| 
|-
| Win
| align=center| 20–3–2
| Masanori Kanehara
| Decision (unanimous)
| World Victory Road Presents: Sengoku 9
| 
| align=center| 3
| align=center| 5:00
| Saitama, Japan
| 
|-
| Win
| align=center| 19–3–2
| Ronnie Mann
| Submission (triangle choke)
| World Victory Road Presents: Sengoku 8
| 
| align=center| 1
| align=center| 3:09
| Tokyo, Japan
| 
|-
| Win
| align=center| 18–3–2
| Chris Manuel
| Submission (triangle armbar)
| World Victory Road Presents: Sengoku 7
| 
| align=center| 1
| align=center| 4:12
| Tokyo, Japan
| 
|-
| Win
| align=center| 17–3–2
| Rumina Sato
| TKO (punches)
| Shooto: Shooto Tradition 4
| 
| align=center| 1
| align=center| 3:32
| Tokyo, Japan
| 
|-
| Win
| align=center| 16–3–2
| Thierry Quenneville
| Submission (triangle choke)
| TKO 35
| 
| align=center| 1
| align=center| 4:14
| Montreal, Quebec, Canada
| 
|-
| Draw
| align=center| 15–3–2
| Hiroshi Nakamura
| Draw
| Shooto: Gig Central 15
| 
| align=center| 3
| align=center| 5:00
| Aichi, Japan
| 
|-
| Win
| align=center| 15–3–1
| Baret Yoshida
| TKO (punches)
| Shooto: Back To Our Roots 8
| 
| align=center| 1
| align=center| 4:51
| Tokyo, Japan
| 
|-
| Win
| align=center| 14–3–1
| Katsuya Toida
| Submission (armbar)
| Shooto: Back To Our Roots 7
| 
| align=center| 2
| align=center| 4:30
| Tokyo, Japan
| 
|-
| Win
| align=center| 13–3–1
| Brian Geraghty
| Decision (unanimous)
| Heat 5
| 
| align=center| 3
| align=center| 5:00
| Aichi, Japan
| 
|-
| Loss
| align=center| 12–3–1
| Kim Jong-Man
| Decision (split)
| Shooto: Gig Central 13
| 
| align=center| 3
| align=center| 5:00
| Aichi, Japan
| 
|-
| Loss
| align=center| 12–2–1
| Antonio Carvalho
| Decision (split)
| Shooto: Back To Our Roots 3
| 
| align=center| 3
| align=center| 5:00
| Tokyo, Japan
| 
|-
| Win
| align=center| 12–1–1
| Mark Hominick
| Decision (majority)
| TKO 28
| 
| align=center| 5
| align=center| 5:00
| Montreal, Quebec, Canada
| 
|-
| Win
| align=center| 11–1–1
| Byon Sho Kim
| TKO (doctor stoppage)
| Shooto: Gig Central 11
| 
| align=center| 1
| align=center| 1:32
| Aichi, Japan
| 
|-
| Win
| align=center| 10–1–1
| Jeff Curran
| Decision (unanimous)
| Pride - Bushido 12
| 
| align=center| 2
| align=center| 5:00
| Aichi, Japan
| 
|-
| Win
| align=center| 9–1–1
| Mark Hominick
| Technical Submission (triangle choke)
| TKO 25
| 
| align=center| 2
| align=center| 5:00
| Montreal, Quebec, Canada
| 
|-
| Draw
| align=center| 8–1–1
| Bao Quach
| Draw
| Shooto: Gig Central 9
| 
| align=center| 3
| align=center| 5:00
| Aichi, Japan
| 
|-
| Win
| align=center| 8–1
| Tom Niinimäki
| Technical Submission (armbar)
| Shooto 2005: 11/6 in Korakuen Hall
| 
| align=center| 1
| align=center| 3:03
| Tokyo, Japan
| 
|-
| Win
| align=center| 7–1
| Hideki Kadowaki
| Submission (armbar)
| Shooto: Gig Central 8
| 
| align=center| 2
| align=center| 3:34
| Nagoya, Japan
| 
|-
| Win
| align=center| 6–1
| Joe Pearson
| Submission (punches)
| Shooto: Gig Central 7
| 
| align=center| 1
| align=center| 1:35
| Nagoya, Japan
| 
|-
| Win
| align=center| 5–1
| Tsutomu Shiiki
| Decision (unanimous)
| Shooto: Gig Central 6
| 
| align=center| 2
| align=center| 5:00
| Nagoya, Japan
| 
|-
| Win
| align=center| 4–1
| Yohei Nanbu
| Decision (unanimous)
| Shooto: Gig Central 5
| 
| align=center| 2
| align=center| 5:00
| Nagoya, Japan
| 
|-
| Loss
| align=center| 3–1
| Hiroyuki Takaya
| Decision (unanimous)
| Shooto: 7/13 in Korakuen Hall
| 
| align=center| 2
| align=center| 5:00
| Tokyo, Japan
| 
|-
| Win
| align=center| 3–0
| Yoshinori Amari
| Submission (armbar)
| Shooto: Gig Central 3
| 
| align=center| 2
| align=center| 2:38
| Nagoya, Japan
| 
|-
| Win
| align=center| 2–0
| Edward Button
| TKO (punches)
| Shooto: Treasure Hunt 11
| 
| align=center| 1
| align=center| 4:11
| Tokyo, Japan
| 
|-
| Win
| align=center| 1–0
| Masanori Sugatani
| Submission (rear-naked choke)
| Shooto: Gig Central 2
| 
| align=center| 1
| align=center| 2:29
| Aichi, Japan
|

See also 
 List of current UFC fighters
 List of male mixed martial artists

References

External links
 
 

1983 births
Living people
Japanese male mixed martial artists
Featherweight mixed martial artists
Mixed martial artists utilizing Brazilian jiu-jitsu
Japanese practitioners of Brazilian jiu-jitsu
People awarded a black belt in Brazilian jiu-jitsu
Sportspeople from Nagoya
Ultimate Fighting Championship male fighters